Braunsiomyia is a genus of horseflies of the family Tabanidae.

Species
Braunsiomyia tigrina Dias & Sous, 1957
Braunsiomyia cinerea (Surcouf, 1921)

References

Tabanidae
Brachycera genera
Taxa named by Joseph Charles Bequaert
Diptera of Africa